Image Union is an American independent documentary series created by Jamie Cesar and Tom Weinberg. It was aired on WTTW, a PBS affiliate in Chicago, Illinois and premiered on November 16, 1978. Each hour-long episode was either a "theme show" or a "potpourri" of work from different video makers and the segments were cut together with few transitions or announcer introductions. The show did not have an official end date and reruns regularly ran on WTTW up until the early 2010s.

Background and overview 
Prior to Image Union, WTTW aired Nightwatch with Gene Siskel, an all-night show featuring the work of independent producers with call-in audience participation. Siskel's hosting gradually took on the focus of the show and this led producers to feel that their work was being misrepresented or demeaned. These grievances reached their peak at a regional conference between independent producers and their local PBS stations, sponsored by NYC Global Village Video Center.

After WTTW president William J. McCarter finished his speech at the convention, the audience criticized him about Nightwatch for three-and-a-half hours. McCarter listened to the outcry and even scheduled a second meeting with the group. This ultimately led to the creation of Image Union under Tom Weinberg, who was "natural liaison" between the independent and corporate worlds, due to his background in the guerilla film movement. Weinberg was the coordinating producer who selected programs and post-production director. Jamie Cesar was the co-producer, who took over the show when Weinberg left later on to pursue other projects.

In comparison to Nightwatch, Image Union was committed to letting the videos speak. Editing was only done with the independent producers’ cooperation and there was no host to transition between the different clips. In example, the first episode of Image Union featured 11 different films and videotapes, ranging from Swiss and German television commercials to old videos of Mayor Daley, with small fillers sometimes separating them. It was intentionally unique, not expected on PBS and akin to an "art gallery context," as Chicago Reader wrote.

The first 100 programs consisted of more than 400 different segment from Chicago and national sources. The rates paid were $12 per aired minute and the creators had to sign release agreements for WTTW's three-year local rights. It was formatted with a 50:50 ratio for film and videotape. In terms of format, tapes were 3/4-inch cassettes that were time based and films were 16mm, but occasionally Super 8. Both formats were transferred to quad and edited to master quadtape.

It aired for 13 seasons.

Reception and impact 

In 1988, Image Union was celebrating its ten-year anniversary. In a feature by Chicago Reader, Weinberg stated that the show had been nominated for 11 Emmys but never won. It was one of the Top 10 WTTW programs and generated 80,000-150,000 viewers each episode.

The success of this show would later enable the WTTW television series The 90's, also produced by Tom Weinberg and very much in similar concept to Image Union.

Episodes

Season 1 (1978-80) 
The first season aired every Saturday at 10PM. It aired 52 weeks a year and had no outside funding as it was all WTTW.

Season 2 (1980)

Season 3 (1980-81)

Season 4

Season 5

Season 6

Season 7 (1984-87)

Season 8 (1985-1986)

Season 9 (1986)

Season 10 (1987-88)

Season 11 (1989)

Season 12 (1989-90)

Season 13 (1990-91)

Specials

References 

Television series by WTTW
1970s American documentary television series
1978 American television series debuts
1999 American television series endings
1980s American documentary television series
1990s American documentary television series